Vakinuvinama is a 2010 Maldivian horror film directed by Amjad Ibrahim. Produced by Fathimath Shifa under See Far Productions, the film stars Niuma Mohamed, Ravee Farooq and Ali Seezan in pivotal roles.

Premise
Rashaga (Niuma Mohamed) is in a romantic relationship with an indolent and short-tempered man, Ihusan (Ravee Farooq). Despite her family's disapproval to their relationship due to Ihusan's indecorous behavior, Rashaga refuses to leave him since he is her first love. One day, Rashaga's younger brother was saved by Zaid (Ali Seezan) from drowning, which helped him secure a place in her family's position. Ihusan breaks up with Rashaga and she marries Zaid as requested by her father, Waheed (Ali Shameel). Soon after she gives birth to a baby girl, Rasha feels sick and fails to be cured by any doctoral medication. One night, Waheed follows Zaid to the forest and discovers his true identity which forces him to do everything possible to save his family.

Cast 
 Niuma Mohamed as Rashaga
 Ravee Farooq as Ihusan
 Ali Shameel as Waheed
 Ali Seezan as Zaid
 Fauziyya Hassan as Ameena
 Nadhiya Hassan as Rashfa
 Hamdhan Farooq as Hussain

Release
The film was premiered on 4 December 2010. Upon release, the film received negative reviews from critics and fared poorly at box-office.

Soundtrack

References

2010 films
2010 horror films
Maldivian films
Maldivian horror films